Eckhard Leue (born 20 March 1958 in Magdeburg) is an East German sprint canoer who competed in the late 1970s and early 1980s. At the 1980 Summer Olympics in Moscow, he won a bronze medal in the C-1 1000 m event.

References
 Sports-reference.com profile

1958 births
Sportspeople from Magdeburg
Canoeists at the 1980 Summer Olympics
German male canoeists
Living people
Olympic canoeists of East Germany
Olympic bronze medalists for East Germany
Olympic medalists in canoeing
Medalists at the 1980 Summer Olympics